CQ Amateur Radio (also known simply as CQ or CQ magazine, and formerly as CQ: The Radio Amateur's Journal) is a magazine for amateur radio enthusiasts first published in 1945.  The English language edition is read worldwide; Spanish language edition is published in Spain with some translations of articles from the English language edition and some original European content.  The magazine was also published in France with partial translation of the original edition between 1995 and 2000 (ISSN 1267-2750). Published by CQ Communications, the title is based on the CQ call.

Contests and awards 
CQ Amateur Radio organizes, adjudicates, and publishes the results of several annual radio competitions, including the  CQ World Wide 160-meter Contest, the CQ World Wide WPX Contest, the CQ World Wide RTTY Contest, the CQ World Wide RTTY WPX Contest, the CQ World Wide DX Contest, and the CQ World Wide VHF Contest.  All of these contests allow participation by amateur radio operators in any country of the world.

CQ Amateur Radio is also associated with a number of amateur radio awards, of which the best known is Worked All Zones. Other awards offered are the WPX and the "USA Counties".

See also 
 Worked All Zones

Further reading 
 Friedman, Neil, CQ "Small Format" Amateur Radio Books, 1947-1984: An Annotated Bibliography,. The AWA Review Vol. 19, 2006.

References

External links 
 CQ World Wide DX Contest
 CQ World Wide WPX Contest

Amateur radio magazines
Monthly magazines published in the United States
Magazines established in 1945
Magazines published in New York (state)